George Robert Cryer (3 December 1934 – 12 April 1994) was an English Labour Party politician from Yorkshire. He sat in the House of Commons of the United Kingdom as the Member of Parliament (MP) for Keighley from 1974 until his defeat in 1983.  He then served as the Member of the European Parliament (MEP) for Sheffield from 1984 to 1989, and returned to the Commons as MP for Bradford South from 1987 until his death in 1994.

He was one of the founders of the Keighley & Worth Valley Railway.

Early life
Born in Bradford, Cryer was educated at Salt High School, Shipley, and the University of Hull. He worked as a teacher and lecturer.

After British Railways closed the Keighley and Worth Valley Railway line in 1962, Cryer was one of a group of people who formed the KWVR Preservation Society, which bought the line and reopened it.  As the society's first chairman, he helped to facilitate the shooting of the film The Railway Children on the line in the summer of 1970 and had a small part in it, as a guard.

Political career
Cryer first stood for Parliament at Darwen in 1964, but was defeated by the incumbent Conservative MP, Charles Fletcher-Cooke.

He was elected the Labour Member of Parliament for Keighley from 1974 to 1983 and represented Bradford South from 1987 until his death in a road traffic accident on 12 April 1994 when he was 59. He was the MEP for Sheffield from 1984 until 1989.

At the start of the Queen's Speech debate on 21 November 1989 – the first time the House of Commons was televised – Cryer raised a point of order on the subject of access to the House, thereby denying the Conservative MP Ian Gow, who was to move the Loyal Address to the Speech from the Throne, the accolade of being the first MP (other than the Speaker, Bernard Weatherill) to speak in the Commons on television.

Cryer supported a number of left-wing causes and he was also a Eurosceptic.

Death
Cryer died in a car accident on 12 April 1994 when the Rover he was driving to London overturned on the M1 motorway near Junction 5 at Watford. His wife Ann survived the crash.

Family
His wife Ann Cryer was MP for Keighley between 1997 and 2010, and their son John Cryer is the MP for Leyton and Wanstead.

Filmography
The Railway Children (1970) - Train Guard (uncredited)

References

External links 
 Keighley & Worth Valley Railway
 Obituary in The Independent
 

1934 births
1994 deaths
Alumni of the University of Hull
Labour Party (UK) MPs for English constituencies
UK MPs 1974–1979
UK MPs 1979–1983
UK MPs 1987–1992
UK MPs 1992–1997
Labour Party (UK) MEPs
Road incident deaths in England
Politicians from Bradford
MEPs for England 1984–1989
British people associated with Heritage Railways
People from Shipley, West Yorkshire